The Basque Museum of the History of Medicine and Science Jose Luis Goti was founded in 1982 to preserve the historic memory of medicine in the Basque Country and conserve its scientific heritage. The Museum is located on the university campus of Leioa (University of the Basque Country) and is important in the training of students in the Faculty of Medicine and the students coming from other faculties and schools. Its nowadays director is the professor and doctor Anton Erkoreka.

Its permanent exposition comprises approx. 6,000 medical objects of the 19th and 20th centuries arranged, thematically in 24 rooms devoted to different medical specialities: folk medicine, unconventional medicine, pharmacy, weights and measures, asepsis and antisepsis, microscopes, laboratory material, X-rays, obstetrics and gynaecology, surgery, anesthesia, endoscope, odontology, cardiology, ophthalmology, electrotherapy, pathological anatomy and natural sciences.

Teaching and research constitute two of the pillars of the Museum that are complemented with publications and the organization of conferences, lectures and other activities.

External links 
Basque Museum of the History of Medicine and Science
The museum in the bulletin of the European Association of Museums of the History of Medical Sciences
Virtual exhibition about electrotherapy
Virtual exhibition about Stultifera navis. The ship of fools
Obstetrics and gynecology through history

Medical museums in Spain
History of medicine
History of science museums
Basque history
University of the Basque Country
Museums established in 1982
Museums in the Basque Country (autonomous community)
University museums in Spain
1982 establishments in Spain